"Mojito" is a song by Mexican singer Thalía. It was released by Sony Music on May 7, 2021, as the fourth single from Thalía's seventeenth studio album Desamorfosis. The song was released as a sneak peek for the album, which was released a week after the song.

Background and release
The song along, with an audio video, was officially released as the fourth single from Desamorfosis on May 7, 2021. The sensual track that refers to the Cuban cocktail fuses various rhythms, from the strings of various Latin genres, to the most urban of the latest trends, using various analogies related to drinking to describe the relationship with his love interest. The song was considered a good sneak peak from the album that was  needed to start a good weekend.

Commercial Performance
The song entered the pop charts in the U.S., Puerto Rico, and the Dominican Republic.

Live performances
Thalía performed the song for the first time as part of a medley with her songs "Piel Morena", "Amor a la Mexicana", "No Me Acuerdo", "¿A Quién Le Importa?", "Arrasando" during Ellas y Su Musica, a special Latin Grammy event celebrating women that she hosted.

Music video
Thalía appeared on The Tonight Show Starring Jimmy Fallon on May 11, 2021, as a special musical guest to promote her album and the song, which included the premiere of the music video. The video chronicles a sun-soaked romance between Thalía and a beachside bartender, who — one can only assume — mixes a mean mojito. After an initial encounter on the beach, the couple meet again at a nightclub and dance to the rich drum skip and tender guitar plucks of the song as Thalía sings. The video became available on YouTube at midnight right after the show. The music video became trending topic on social networks and sparked the #Mojitochallenge on TikTok where followers have to do the same dance Thalía did on her video and upload it to the network so she could pick the best ones.

Charts

Weekly Charts

Year-end charts

References

 
Thalía songs
2021 singles
2021 songs
Spanish-language songs
Songs written by Thalía
Songs written by Elena Rose